The following list contains the largest wild terrestrial members of the order Carnivora, ranked in accordance to their maximum mass.

List

See also

List of largest mammals
List of largest cats
Largest organisms
List of largest wild canids

References

Carnivorans
Carnivorans